The Cyclone Kid is a 1931 American Western film directed by J.P. McGowan and starring Buzz Barton, Francis X. Bushman Jr. and Caryl Lincoln.

Cast
 Buzz Barton as Buddy Comstock 
 Francis X. Bushman Jr. as Steve Andrews 
 Caryl Lincoln as Rose Comstock 
 Lafe McKee as Harvey Comstock 
 Ted Adams as Joe Clark 
 Nadja as Pepita 
 Blackie Whiteford as Henchman Pete
 Silver Harr as Sheriff

References

Bibliography
 Michael R. Pitts. Poverty Row Studios, 1929–1940: An Illustrated History of 55 Independent Film Companies, with a Filmography for Each. McFarland & Company, 2005.

External links
 

1931 films
1931 Western (genre) films
American Western (genre) films
Films directed by J. P. McGowan
1930s English-language films
1930s American films